Arkadiy Oleksiyovych Kornatskiy (born July 7, 1953, Mykolaiv Oblast) is a Ukrainian politician, public figure and civil servant. He is a member of the Petro Poroshenko Bloc and was a People's Deputy of the 8th Ukrainian Verkhovna Rada from the 2014 Ukrainian parliamentary election until the 2019 Ukrainian parliamentary election. For the 2019 election the Central Election Commission of Ukraine refused to register him.

Kornatskiy was a candidate for President of Ukraine in the 2019 Ukrainian presidential elections. He came 37 out of 39 candidates, with 4,494 votes (0.02%).

References

External links
 Верховна Рада України 

1953 births
Living people
People from Mykolaiv Oblast
Candidates in the 2019 Ukrainian presidential election
Peoples' Friendship University of Russia alumni
Ukrainian jurists
20th-century Ukrainian businesspeople
21st-century Ukrainian businesspeople
Eighth convocation members of the Verkhovna Rada